Zayn Alexander is a Lebanese film director and actor based in New York City. He is known for his work on the short films Abroad and Manara.

Life and career
Alexander was born and raised in Lebanon.
Alexander studied psychology at the American University of Beirut and left for the United States to pursue acting in 2010. In New York City, he met fellow actor, Pascale Seigneurie, who would soon become a frequent collaborator. The two paired up to create Abroad, a film about a Lebanese couple pursuing their acting dreams in America and struggling with being typecast in Middle Eastern roles. Seigneurie wrote the short film, Alexander directed. The film was shot in one day. It debuted at the Santa Barbara International Film Festival in 2018. The Moise A. Khayrallah Center has awarded Alexander and Abroad The 2020 Khayrallah Art Prize.

In 2019, Alexander and Seigneurie followed up with Manara, a short film about a Lebanese funeral and a family coping with the cultural pressures of Lebanese society. Manara was filmed in Tyre, Lebanon. It debuted during the 76th Venice International Film Festival in September 2019.

Filmography

References

External links
Zayn Alexander  Official website

Living people
Lebanese film directors
Lebanese male film actors
American University of Beirut alumni
Year of birth missing (living people)